Karin Hanczewski (born 22 December 1981) is a German actress.

Early life
Hanczewski comes from a Polish family. After four years of training at the European Theatre Institute in Berlin, which began in 2002, she was given a permanent position at the Junge Theatre in Göttingen from 2005 to 2008. She received her first film and television roles in the debut film Marla by Marta Malowanczyk, in which she played the leading role and which was nominated for the First Steps film award, as well as in Tatort: … es wird Trauer sein und Schmerz. Since then, she has appeared in short, feature and television films. Furthermore, she starred in a play every year from 2009 to 2012.

Since 2016, she portrays Karin Gorniak as part of the investigative team Winkler, Gorniak and Schnabel in the MDR television series Tatort ("Dresden Detectives" episodes).

Personal life
On 5 February 2021, as part of the #ActOut initiative in SZ-Magazin, Hanczewski came out as lesbian alongside 184 other lesbian, gay, bisexual, queer, non-binary and transgender actors. The initiative was initiated jointly by Godehard Giese, Eva Meckbach and Hanczewski herself in order to create further acceptance in their industry and in society. In an interview, she has stated that she had been warned about coming out with regard to the casting of further role offers after she had been cast for the television series Tatort.

References

External links 

 

1981 births
Living people
Actresses from Berlin
German people of Polish descent
German film actresses
German stage actresses
German television actresses
20th-century German actresses
21st-century German actresses
German lesbian actresses